D'Hanis is a census-designated place in central Medina County, Texas, United States. The population was 548, as of 2000. It was primarily settled in the 1800s by German emigrants.

D'Hanis is located at the intersections of U.S. Route 90, Farm to Market Road 1796 and Farm to Market Road 2200 on Seco Creek. The community is sometimes called New D'Hanis to distinguish it from the site of old D'Hanis one mile to the east.

History
D'Hanis is named for Count von D'Hanis, who founded the town about 1845. D'Hanis was settled by 29 Alsatian families from present-day France and Germany. Many residents spoke Alsatian and German, however, some Alsatians were ethnic Germans who clung to the German culture, language, and traditions. D'Hanis was one of several towns that Henri Castro founded.

Geography

Education 
The D'Hanis Independent School District maintains a K-12 school located near Highway 90. The current school has been renovated and expanded many times; the most recent additions were completed in the fall of 2009. The current secondary school principal is Kurt Shoemaker and the district superintendent is Gary Patterson. The elementary principal is Marinda Santos.   Its mascots are (middle school) Colts and (high school) Cowboys and Cowgirls. Basketball, football, baseball, golf, track and tennis are varsity sports there.

Tourism 
The few remaining walls of St. Dominic's Church and Cemetery, now part of the ghost town of Old D'Hanis, are situated south of Highway 90. The ruins of Fort Lincoln, another historical attraction, can be found north of town along FM 1796.

References

External links 

 

Census-designated places in Medina County, Texas
Census-designated places in Texas
Unincorporated communities in Texas
Greater San Antonio
Populated places established in 1847
San Antonio–El Paso Road
San Antonio–San Diego Mail Line
1847 establishments in Texas
Stagecoach stops in the United States